The Talbot Samba Rallye was Group B rally car, designed, developed and built by French manufacturer Peugeot, in 1983.

Talbot Samba Rally Group B
After the success with amateur drivers of the Simca Rallye and the 104 GR2 and GR5, the Peugeot Talbot sport group under the leadership of Jean Todt decided to homologate the Talbot Samba Rallye in group B.

It will prove to be effective on asphalt, handy with very good road holding.

Talbot Samba Rallye Group B type SRE 
It was in January 1983that the Samba type SRE is homologated sheet B-232. Two hundred copies are produced by the PTS group wishing to move towards private pilots.

The group offers a competition vehicle that is less expensive than other brands but which remains very competitive. In its first version, this Samba GRB has nothing to envy of the other cars in the world championship. Its lightweight is 675  kg thanks to the fiberglass body parts (the doors, the rear hatch, the engine cover). The suspensions are provided by coil overs. These brakes are Ap Lockheed four-piston calipers at the front and aluminum two-piston calipers for the rear.

We also find the aluminum alloy roll bar, direct steering, Makrolon windows, hydraulic handbrake, one-piece PTS rims, front and rear anti-roll bar, four-in-two-in-one exhaust, oil cooler, and reinforced rear axle.

Its engine is increased to 1,285 cc with an overhead camshaft developing 130 hp, all coupled to a short gearbox with self-locking.

Talbot Samba Rallye Group B SRE2 evolution
In January 1984the Samba Rallye evolution type SR2 is homologated.

The changes are numerous: increased tracks with wide fenders in polyester, triangulated front axle, new engine cradle, lengthened and reinforced transmission gimbals, fiber front bumper with brake cooling scoops, new anti-roll bar, standard exhaust three Ys, adoption of a new generation front and rear AP brake, specific steering rods and the possibility of choosing five different roll cage models (aluminum or steel).

The engine increases to 1,296 cm³ and 136 hp with the adoption of a more aggressive camshaft and larger intake ducts.

Quickly a catalog including all the Samba group B parts is offered by the Peugeot team. This is how some private pilots could have their own GrB samba built by small workshops like Mathiot, Brozzi, and Bouhier. This has the effect of increasing the number of Samba group B beyond the initial two hundred copies 3.

The car notably won the 1985 Al Fito Hill Climb, with Spaniard Paulino Diaz.

The 1,440 cm3 and 1,550 cm3
Two engine manufacturers are at the origin of the development of these ultimate evolutions. They are Mathiot and Brozzi, they obtain these displacements by changing the engine bore to 78.50  mm for the 1440 and 80 mm for 1550.

These engines were already present on the Peugeot 104 Group 5 as well as on the Citroën Visa 1000 tracks.

But to fit in with rally regulations, there was an obligation to weigh down the little Samba by ballasting it in order to obtain 750  kg, which corresponded to the 1,600  cm 3 class. On the other hand, in the hill climb, it was at the right weight of 675  kg and in this discipline, it became an even more efficient and formidable machine.

References

Peugeot vehicles
Simca vehicles
Talbot vehicles
Front-wheel-drive vehicles
Group B cars
Hatchbacks
Mid-size cars
Rally cars
Cars introduced in 1983
1980s cars
City cars
Cars of France